The Troup County School District is a public school district in Troup County, Georgia, United States, based in county seat LaGrange. It serves the communities of Hogansville, LaGrange, and West Point.

Schools
The Troup County School District has eleven elementary schools, three middle schools, and five high schools.

Elementary schools
Berta Weathersbee Elementary School
Callaway Elementary School
Clearview Elementary School
Ethel Kight Elementary School
Franklin Forest Elementary School
Hillcrest Elementary School
Hogansville Elementary School
Hollis Hand Elementary School
Long Cane Elementary School
Rosemont Elementary School
West Point Elementary School
Whitesville Road Elementary School

Middle schools
Callaway Middle School
Gardner Newman Middle School
Long Cane Middle School

High schools
Callaway High School
Hope Academy
LaGrange High School
Thinc Academy
Troup County Career Center
Troup County High School

References

External links

School districts in Georgia (U.S. state)
Education in Troup County, Georgia